Sobia Khan (born 24 June 1991) is a Pakistani film actress known for her works predominantly in Pashto cinema, along with Punjabi, and Urdu films. She also worked in plays and television.

Personal life
Sobia was born on 24 June 1991 or 1994 in Karachi, Pakistan.

In May 2018, she married Pakistani cricketer Usman Qadir. and The actress two daughters,Hoorain Zahra Usman Qadir and Romaisa Zahra Usman Qadir

Career
Sobia started her artistic career with a stage play in al-Hamra, after that she continued to work in theaters, TV serials and films. She has worked in more than 40 film and have been in among the Syed Noor film “Chain Aye Na”.

Filmography

References

Living people
1991 births
Actresses from Karachi
Pakistani film actresses
Pakistani television actresses
Actresses in Pashto cinema
Actresses in Punjabi cinema
Actresses in Urdu cinema